Milos Island National Airport is an airport in Milos, Greece . Milos is an island in the Cyclades. The airport is located 5 kilometers southeast of the harbour of the island. The airport was opened on January 17, 1973. In October 1995, a new terminal was taken into use.

Infrastructure
As the airport has a small apron (7,800 square meters) and a short runway, only Dash 8, ATR 42, or smaller aircraft are able to use the airport. Plans exist for a 2,000 by 45 meter runway at a new location and the expansion of the apron space to 26,000 square meters. However, due to the economical difficulties, these plans have been suspended. The current apron can handle only one Dash 8 sized aircraft or two light aircraft at one given time.

Airlines and destinations
The following airlines operate regular scheduled and charter flights at Milos Island Airport:

Statistics

Annual passenger throughput

Ground transport
Other than by car, the airport is linked to the rest of the island by taxi. There are bus connections linking to the airport.

See also
List of the busiest airports in Greece
Transport in Greece

References

External links
http://www.hcaa.gr/en/our-airports/kratikos-aerolimenas-mhloy-kaml Hellenic Civil Aviation Authority - Milos Airport
https://archive.today/20130217163434/http://www.alxd.gr/AirportGuide/milos/milosE.html Alexandroupolis Airport - Greek Airport Guide

Airports in Greece
Buildings and structures in the South Aegean
Milos